Marc Cerboni (20 October 1955 – 2 December 1990) was a French fencer. He won a bronze medal in the team foil event at the 1984 Summer Olympics.

References

External links
 

1955 births
1990 deaths
Sportspeople from Nice
French male foil fencers
Olympic fencers of France
Fencers at the 1984 Summer Olympics
Olympic bronze medalists for France
Olympic medalists in fencing
Medalists at the 1984 Summer Olympics
20th-century French people